Pushkinsky (masculine), Pushkinskaya (feminine), or Pushkinskoye (neuter) is the name of several rural localities in Russia:

Pushkinsky, Republic of Bashkortostan, a khutor in Bishkainsky Selsoviet of Aurgazinsky District of the Republic of Bashkortostan
Pushkinsky, Irkutsk Oblast, an area in Nizhneudinsky District of Irkutsk Oblast
Pushkinsky, Orenburg Oblast, a settlement in Pushkinsky Selsoviet of Krasnogvardeysky District of Orenburg Oblast
Pushkinskoye, Republic of Bashkortostan, a village in Kaltymanovsky Selsoviet of Iglinsky District of the Republic of Bashkortostan
Pushkinskoye, Kaliningrad Oblast, a settlement in Khrabrovsky Rural Okrug of Guryevsky District of Kaliningrad Oblast
Pushkinskoye, Republic of Kalmykia, a selo in Pushkinskaya Rural Administration of Gorodovikovsky District of the Republic of Kalmykia
Pushkinskoye, Krasnodar Krai, a selo in Gulkevichsky District of Krasnodar Krai